The Malfatti Commission is the European Commission that held office from 1 July 1970 to 21 March 1972. Its president was Franco Maria Malfatti.

Work 
It was the successor to the Rey Commission and was succeeded by the Mansholt Commission.  The Malfatti Commission began as the integration process was relaunched: the EC adopting a financial framework and competing the single market.  There was also the beginnings of political cooperation, monetary cooperation and of enlargement as talks opened with Denmark, Ireland, Norway and the United Kingdom.

Membership

Summary by political leanings 
The colour of the row indicates the approximate political leaning of the office holder using the following scheme:

See also 
 Delors Commission
 Santer Commission
 Prodi Commission
 Barroso Commission

References

External links 
 European Commission Website

 
European Commissions